Ramendra Narayan Kalita is an Asom Gana Parishad politician from Assam. He was elected in Assam Legislative Assembly election in 1985 to 1996, 2006 and 2016 from Gauhati West constituency.

References 

Living people
Asom Gana Parishad politicians
Politicians from Guwahati
Assam MLAs 1985–1991
Assam MLAs 1991–1996
Assam MLAs 1996–2001
Assam MLAs 2006–2011
Assam MLAs 2016–2021
Year of birth missing (living people)